The Imperial Centre for the Arts and Sciences is an arts and science museum in Rocky Mount, North Carolina that hosts the Maria V. Howard Arts Center, Rocky Mount Children's Museum and Science Center, Cummins Planetarium, and a community theater. It is located on the 135,000 square foot redeveloped site of the Imperial Tobacco Company of Great Britain and Ireland (dating from the late 19th century) and Braswell Memorial Library's old building after the former museum and arts center were flooded and heavily damaged during Hurricane Floyd in 1999. Currently the museum hosts annual juried sculptures displays, 10 art galleries, material and performance art classes, and a variety of community events like First Friday movie nights held on the grounds during the summer.

References

External links

Art museums and galleries in North Carolina
Children's museums in North Carolina
Science museums in North Carolina